Up Close was an ESPN TV series 1981–2001.

Up Close may also refer to:

Up Close (Eric Johnson album)
Up Close (Gina Jeffreys album)
Up Close (Jesse McCartney album)

See also
Up Close and Personal (disambiguation)